This was the first edition of the event, the title was won by Saketh Myneni who beat Jordan Thompson in the final 7–5, 6–3.

Seeds

Draw

Finals

Top half

Bottom half

References
 Main Draw
 Qualifying Draw

Vietnam Open (tennis) - Singles
2015 Singles